Personal wedding websites are websites that engaged couples use to aid in planning and communication for their wedding. The websites are used to communicate with guests of their wedding and inform them of location, date, time, and a gift registry. Each wedding website is different, and a couple has to pick what is best for them. The websites can be free but may sometimes cost a fee. However, most couples find that the website fee is less costly than hiring a wedding planner, as wedding planners can cost as much as 15% of the total wedding cost. Criticism of wedding websites include that invitations from websites are too informal for the occasion.

Personal wedding websites differ from wedding vendor websites.  Some wedding vendor websites allow customers to plan and book very small weddings on their websites, using that vendor's location, officiant, photographer, and other services.

Purpose
Personal wedding websites are used for a variety of purposes including communication with guests, sharing wedding photos and videos with those who were unable to attend, providing maps, hotel and destination information, bridal party and couple biographies, and profiling vendors. Increasingly the sites are being used as tools for wedding planning. Many do-it-yourself sites offer features like online RSVP, blogs, registry management, and budget management tools to aid couples through the wedding organizing process. Wedding websites offer a way for couples to showcase their personality and set the tone for what their wedding will be like.

As wedding couples see the importance of wedding websites, there has been a growth in worldwide wedding website suppliers. Led by many of the large United States based operators, wedding website suppliers now operate in many worldwide locations, many creating specific functionality and tools for their own national identities, customs and faiths. Each website offers different templates, services, and some charge a fee to use them and experts recommend comparing websites before choosing one.

Depending on the specific site, some will host the personal "wedpage" for six months, 12 months, or forever. The cost is strongly correlated between factors such as domain name, advertisements appearing on the page, number of pages available, and different amounts/types of media available.

Communication

Through the use of the internet information about any wedding has become available to anyone with a smart phone or a computer. This is an improvement from standard wedding invitations which only allow for limited information about the ceremony and reception. With the ability to view the website, a guest has the option to RSVP, choose their meal, see surrounding attractions in the area, view the accommodations to reserve a hotel room, and view the bridal party list. A website can also allow a couple to post additional engagement photos, share stories of how they met and got engaged, include links to their online wedding registries, and also receive online guestbook comments. Though the standard mailed invitation is a carried out tradition, websites allow for a more interactive way to communicate the information.

Comparing and contrasting the price of wedding planner with price of website
While personal wedding websites are mostly to give the guests information on the wedding such as the date, time and location, the websites can also include things such as blogs and planning bibliographies in which viewers of the wedding website can interact with the bride. Weddings brought to life from personal wedding websites may lack in creativity and originality as many of them suggest traditional weddings and encourage brides to look at celebrity weddings for inspiration. Most brides see personal wedding website, particularly free ones, as a more cost-efficient way of planning and informing friends and family about their wedding, however, some of these websites promote expensive wedding products and ideas as opposed to less expensive and more realistic items. With free or fee-based websites, the user receives their own domain name for the website. It is also important to note that wedding planners are to help the bride while the wedding website caters more to the guests. Most wedding websites are used for both planning purposes and personal pages.

According to White Weddings: Romancing Heterosexuality in Popular Culture, wedding planners typically consist of 15% of the wedding's total cost.  Depending on what percent the planner takes, they usually make between $2,880 and $4,320 for every wedding they plan. Wedding planners can charge an hourly wage, ranging from $40-$100, depending on which part of the country they conduct their services in. The rate also depends on how much experience the wedding planner has had; those with more experience are paid more than those just starting out.

Criticism of wedding websites
Criticism of wedding websites includes the process of sending out invitations via email rather than by mail. In a recent survey, 37% of voters said that evites should "never" be sent out, while 49% said it "depended on the wedding," and 14% said "anytime." Most wedding planning books suggest to the brides ways to find cheaper wedding invitations and typically do not suggest evites. However, evites are a money-saving and environmentally friendly way of sending invitations. Money is not spent on the actual paper and postage and paper is not used.

Website etiquette can become complicated when it comes to what information can be put on the personal site. Putting a gift registry on the website is looked down upon by some experts. Couples can put the registry on the websites but let the guests find it themselves. Couples are not to put events that not all guests are invited to on the website, such as the engagement party or wedding shower.

See also

 Capsule
 Event planning

References

Wedding
Matrimonial websites
Social planning websites